Montpellier Cathedral is a Roman Catholic church dedicated to Saint Peter and located in the city of Montpellier, France. It is the seat of the Archbishops of Montpellier. The cathedral, built in the Gothic style, is a national monument.

History
The cathedral was originally the church of the monastery of Saint-Benoît, which was founded in 1364. The building was elevated to the status of cathedral in 1536, when the see of Maguelonne was transferred to Montpellier. After the building suffered extensive damage during the Wars of Religion between Catholics and Protestants in the 16th century, it was rebuilt in the 17th.

External links

 Monum.fr: cathedral entry
 Location
 www.cathedrale-montpellier.fr

Roman Catholic cathedrals in France
Churches in Hérault
Buildings and structures in Montpellier
Basilica churches in France
Tourist attractions in Montpellier
Monuments historiques of Hérault